Harold Daniel Ahern (14 September 1903 – 17 July 1987) was an Australian politician.

He attended the Royal Melbourne Technical College and the University of Sydney, qualifying as an engineer. On 8 August 1938 he married Bertha Wilhelmina Prismall, with whom he had two sons. He worked for the Public Works Department as a rural development engineer and then for the British Houston Company before becoming an executive of the Electric Light and Power Supply Corporation. From 1949 to 1973 he was a Liberal member of the New South Wales Legislative Council. Ahern died at Mosman in 1987.

References

1903 births
1987 deaths
Liberal Party of Australia members of the Parliament of New South Wales
Members of the New South Wales Legislative Council
RMIT University alumni
University of Sydney alumni
20th-century Australian engineers
20th-century Australian politicians